Megacyllene globosa is a species of beetle in the family Cerambycidae. It was described by Aragao and Monne in 2011.

References

Megacyllene
Beetles described in 2011